The 2010 Wisconsin Wolfpack season was the second season for the Continental Indoor Football League (CIFL) franchise. For 2010, the Wolfpack chose to move its home games to the Hartmeyer Arena on the northeast side of Madison.  2010 also saw the team stock its roster with more players from the nearby Wisconsin Badgers football program.  Joining defensive lineman Kurt Ware and linebacker James Kamoku from the 2009 Wolfpack would be tight end Andy Crooks, safety Josh Nettles, defensive lineman Ricky Garner, offensive lineman Kenny Jones and, following a season-ending injury to quarterback Brian Ryczkowski, Matt Schabert.  Under Schabert's guidance, the Wolfpack had its most successful season to date, indoor or outdoor, finishing the regular season 8-2 and becoming the only team to defeat the then-undefeated Cincinnati Commandos.  The Wolfpack would win its first-ever home playoff game, beating the Fort Wayne FireHawks, 25-24, before falling to the Commandos in the 2010 CIFL Championship Game, 54-40, in Cincinnati.

Schedule

Standings

Playoff schedule

Roster

Stats

Passing

Rushing

Receiving

Regular season

Week 4: vs. Miami Valley Silverbacks

Week 5: vs. Cincinnati Commandos

Week 6: vs. Fort Wayne FireHawks

Week 7: vs. Marion Mayhem

Week 8: vs. Fort Wayne FireHawks

Week 9: vs. Chicago Cardinals

Week 10: vs. Miami Valley Silverbacks

Week 11: vs. Chicago Cardinals

Week 12: vs. Cincinnati Commandos

Week 13: vs. Marion Mayhem

Playoffs

Semifinals: vs. Wisconsin Wolfpack

CIFL Championship Game: vs. Cincinnati Commandos

References

2010 Continental Indoor Football League season
Wisconsin Wolfpack
Wisconsin Wolfpack